Micropsis is a genus of South American flowering plants in the family Asteraceae.

 Species
 Micropsis australis Cabrera - Argentina
 Micropsis dasycarpa (Griseb.) Beauverd - Rio Grande do Sul, Argentina, Paraguay, Uruguay; naturalized in Victoria County in Texas
 Micropsis nana DC. - Chile including Juan Fernández Islands
 Micropsis ostenii Beauverd - Uruguay, northeastern Argentina (Buenos Aires + Entre Ríos)
 Micropsis spathulata (Pers.) Cabrera - Rio Grande do Sul, Argentina (Buenos Aires, Corrientes, Entre Ríos), Paraguay, Uruguay

References

Gnaphalieae
Asteraceae genera